Melki is a surname. Notable people with the surname include:

Alexander Michel Melki (born 1992), Lebanese footballer
Claude Melki (1939–1994), French actor
Gilbert Melki (born 1958), French actor
Felix Michel Melki (born 1994), Lebanese footballer
Leonard Melki (1881–1915), Eastern Catholic priest 
Rodolphe Melki (born 1967), French Lebanese businessman
Mourad Melki (born 1975), Tunisian football player
Pierre-Antoine Melki, of French music production and songwriting duo soFLY & Nius
Yaqub Melki, or Flavianus Michael Malke (1856-1915), Syrian Catholic bishop, martyr

See also

Maleki (disambiguation)
Melkite, various Byzantine Rite Christian churches 
Kfar Melki, town in the Sidon District, Lebanon